The Legend of Bagger Vance: A Novel of Golf and the Game of Life is a 1995 American novel by Steven Pressfield that was adapted into the 2000 film The Legend of Bagger Vance.

Plot
During the Great Depression of 1931, two legends of golf, Bobby Jones and Walter Hagen, compete in a 36-hole showdown. Another golfer also competes, a troubled local war hero named R. Junuh with a mentor and caddie, the mysterious Bagger Vance.

Similarities to the Hindu epic Mahabharata 
The plot is loosely based on the Hindu sacred text the Bhagavad Gita, part of the Mahabharata, where the Warrior/Hero Arjuna (R. Junuh) refuses to fight.  The god Krishna appears as Bhagavan (Bagger Vance) to help Arjuna follow the path of the warrior and hero that he was meant to take. This relationship was fully explained by Steven J. Rosen in his 2000 book Gita on the Green: The Mystical Tradition Behind Bagger Vance, for which Pressfield wrote the foreword.

References

1995 American novels
American novels adapted into films
Bhagavad Gita
Great Depression novels
Novels about golf
Novels by Steven Pressfield
Novels based on the Mahabharata
William Morrow and Company books